Viney Mountain is a summit in West Virginia, in the United States.

According to tradition, Viney Mountain derives its name from Vina, a slave who received manumission and the mountain upon her master's death.

References

Mountains of Pocahontas County, West Virginia
Mountains of West Virginia